Tagged may refer to:
 Tagged (web series), an American teen psychological thriller web series
 Tagged (website), a social discovery website

See also
 Tag (disambiguation)